Bryan Xavier Anastatia (born 14 July 1992 in Netherlands) is a professional footballer who plays as a defender for CRKSV Jong Holland and the Curaçao national football team.

Club career
In 2010, he signed for Curaçao League side CRKSV Jong Holland.

International career

Netherlands Antilles
On 13 October 2010 he made his debut for the Netherlands Antilles national football team in a match against the Suriname national football team in the 2010 Caribbean Championship.

Curaçao
On 20 August 2011 he made his debut for the Curaçao national football team in a friendly match against the Dominican Republic national football team.

References 

1992 births
Living people
Curaçao footballers
Curaçao international footballers
Dutch Antillean footballers
Netherlands Antilles international footballers
Sekshon Pagá players
Association football defenders
Dual internationalists (football)
CRKSV Jong Holland players